Fort Logan may refer to:

Places
 Fort Logan (Colorado), an 1887-1946 Army installation located southwest of Denver, Colorado
 Fort Logan, Colorado, a neighborhood of Englewood, Colorado named for the former fort
 Fort Logan and Blockhouse, a Montana site on the National Register of Historic Places

Other uses
 Fort Logan Elementary School at Englewood, Colorado § Education
 Fort Logan National Cemetery, the remaining federal site of the fort